El-Kanemi Stadium is a multi-use stadium in Maiduguri, Nigeria.  It is currently used mostly for football matches and is the home stadium of El-Kanemi Warriors.  The stadium has a seating capacity of 10,000 people. It was named after the Kanem-Borno Empire ruler, Muhammad al-Amin al-Kanemi.

Football venues in Nigeria
Maiduguri
El-Kanemi Warriors F.C.